The 2012–13 Caribbean Twenty20 was the fourth season of the Caribbean Twenty20, a domestic Twenty20 tournament administered by the West Indies Cricket Board. 23 matches were played from 6 to 20 January 2013. This was the first season to feature only the seven West Indies first-class teams and no invited overseas teams.

Trinidad and Tobago won their third successive title. They also qualified for the 2013 Champions League Twenty20.

Venues 
All matches were played at the following two grounds:

Format
The format was the changed from the previous seasons. The tournament consisted of 23 matches, divided into a group stage and a playoff stage. The group stage consisted of one group instead of the previous two, with each the teams playing a round-robin tournament. The second and third placed teams played in the playoff. The final was played between the first placed team from the group stage and the winner of the playoff. If a match ended in a tie, a Super Over would have been played to determine the winner.

Points in the group stage were awarded as follows:

Teams and standings

Fixtures
All times shown are in Eastern Caribbean Time (UTC−04:00).

Group stage

Playoff stage
Playoff

Final

Statistics

Highest team totals
The following table lists the six highest team scores during the season.

Last Updated 20 January 2013.

Most runs
The top five highest run scorers (total runs) in the season are included in this table.

Last Updated 21 January 2013.

Highest individual scores
This table contains the top five highest scores of the season made by a batsman in a single innings.

Last Updated 20 January 2013.

Most wickets
The following table contains the five leading wicket-takers of the season.

Last Updated 20 January 2013.

Best bowling figures
This table lists the top five players with the best bowling figures in the season.

Last Updated 20 January 2013.

References

External links
Official Caribbean T20 website
Tournament website on ESPN Cricinfo
Tournament records on ESPN Cricinfo

C
Caribbean Twenty20
Caribbean Twenty20
Caribbean Twenty20